Tamariani, is a rural locality (aul) in Dzheyrakhsky District of the Republic of Ingushetia, Russia. Tamariani is one of the 6 rural localities constituting Dzheyrakh rural settlement. Tamariani has only one street, named Vodnaya, which means aquatic in Russian, referring to its geographical positioning on the right embankment of the Terek river.

Etymology
Tamariani is a Georgian literary monument, compiled by the medieval Georgian poet Chakhrukhadze. The name Tamariani is derived from the famous Georgian queen, Tamara, who is praised in the literary work. The word "Tamariani" is a compound of the name "Tamara" and the Georgian suffix "-iani" which is used to create adjectives and nouns denoting a characteristic or an attribute of a person.

The use of the name "Tamariani" to describe the literary work highlights the central role that Queen Tamara plays in the poem and her role in Georgian history and culture. The Tamariani is a testament to the poet's reverence for Queen Tamara and serves as a historical document that sheds light on the cultural and literary heritage of medieval Georgia.

History 
Tamariani's history is rooted in the events and migration patterns of the region. The village of Gubasanty, located at the confluence of the Guba-Santy-Suu river into Baksan, was situated on the site of Tamariani before it was established. The village consisted of two quarters, with the Tilovs living on the left bank and the Kurdanovs living on the right bank.

Pre-establishment period
In the 1930s, the upper reaches of the Baksan Gorge were populated by the Balkars, who lived in two quarters: the Tilovs on the left bank and the Kurdanovs on the right bank. However, in 1944, the entire Balkar population was deported to Central Asia as a result of the Soviet government's policies towards ethnic groups deemed as a potential security threat. This resulted in the abolishment of the Balkar village and the upper reaches of the Baksan Gorge being transferred to the Georgian SSR.

After the deportation of the Balkars to Central Asia, a team of settlers from the Elbrus collective farm established themselves in the area. However, in 1944, the upper reaches of the Baksan Gorge were transferred to the Upper Svaneti region of the Georgian SSR. It was during this time that Georgian settlers founded the village of Tamariani, opposite the abolished Balkar village.

Establishment
In 1957, the Balkars were rehabilitated and allowed to return to their former places of residence, and the village of Tamariani was abolished. All residential buildings were either destroyed or burned, and the upper reaches of the Baksan Gorge were returned to the restored KBASSR.

Georgian settlers established the village of Tamariani opposite the abolished Balkar village. The village was established as a new settlement for the Georgian settlers who were looking for new opportunities and a fresh start. The name Tamariani translates from Georgian as "the place where Tamara was". A settlement with the same name also exists in Georgia.

Geography
Tamariani, a village in the southern part of the Elbrus region, was located on the right bank of the Baksan River, about 40 km north of Mestia (the regional center) and 500 km north-west of Tbilisi. The village bordered the lands of the settlements Bukhaidze to the north, Ganakhleba to the west, and Elbrus to the southwest.

Tamariani was situated on a narrow elevated terrace at the foot of a ridge, with an average height of 1799 meters above sea level. The highest point in the area is Mount Andyrchi, which stands at 3938 meters. The hydrographic network of the region is primarily represented by the Baksan River and its various small right tributaries.

References 

Rural localities in Ingushetia